Louisiana Highway 33 (LA 33) is a state highway located in northern Louisiana.  It runs  in a southwest to northeast direction from U.S. Highway 80 (US 80) in Ruston to the Arkansas state line north of Marion.

The route begins east of Ruston's downtown area and provides access to one of the city's three interchanges with Interstate 20 (I-20).  Midway along its route, LA 33 joins LA 15 across Lake D'Arbonne, a popular recreational spot, and through the adjacent town of Farmerville.  North of Marion, the roadway continues as Arkansas Highway 129 toward Huttig, Arkansas.

LA 33 was designated in the 1955 Louisiana Highway renumbering, replacing portions of three routes: State Route 44, State Route 11, and State Route 156.  This created a single highway designation connecting the seats of Lincoln and Union parishes to each other and with the Arkansas state line.

Route description

Ruston to Farmerville
From the south, LA 33 begins at a junction with US 80 (East Georgia Avenue) in Ruston, a city in Lincoln Parish.  It heads northeast on Farmerville Highway, an undivided four-lane thoroughfare, and passes through a diamond interchange with I-20 at exit 86.  I-20 parallels US 80 throughout the state and connects with the metropolitan areas of Shreveport to the west and Monroe to the east.  Gaining a center turning lane, LA 33 proceeds through a growing commercial corridor that extends out of the Ruston city limits.

The surroundings become largely rural near an intersection with LA 821, and LA 33 narrows to an undivided two-lane highway.  Shortly afterward is an intersection with LA 3072, a short connector to the nearby town of Vienna.  LA 33 curves slightly more to the east and overlaps LA 822 through an area known as Cedarton.  About midway along this concurrency is a junction with LA 820, connecting with Choudrant to the south.

LA 33 crosses into Union Parish and immediately intersects LA 151 in the community of D'Arbonne, providing connections to Downsville and Dubach.  About  later, LA 33 begins a concurrency with LA 15, and the two routes proceed across Lake D'Arbonne along a narrow embankment.  Approaching the opposite shore, the roadway transitions onto the James Peyton Smith Bridge, a low beam bridge that spans an open stretch of the lake.

Farmerville to Arkansas line
Once on shore, LA 15 and LA 33 enter the town of Farmerville, which is also the parish seat.  The highway travels along Main Street and curves due north through the center of town.  An intersection with LA 3281 (Park Street), provides access to the nearby Louisiana National Guard Armory.  Two blocks later at Water Street, LA 2 turns north to join LA 15 and LA 33 through the business section.  LA 33 departs from the concurrency by turning east onto Miller Street.  It then curves northeast onto Marion Highway past Farmerville Stadium and out of the town.

LA 33 continues northeast for about  through sparsely populated pine forests before reaching the town of Marion.  Here, the highway turns east onto Main Street through the town center then north onto Taylor Street at an intersection with LA 143.  LA 33 continues north through rural Union Parish for another  before reaching the Arkansas state line just north of Sadie.  The road continues toward Huttig as Arkansas Highway 129 (AR 129).

Route classification and data
LA 33 is generally classified by the Louisiana Department of Transportation and Development (La DOTD) as an urban principal arterial in Ruston and as a rural major collector northward. Daily traffic volume in 2013 peaked at 18,600 vehicles in Ruston and 11,600 in Farmerville, tapering down to 1,010 near the Arkansas state line.

History
In the original Louisiana Highway system in use between 1921 and 1955, LA 33 was part of four different routes: State Route 44 from Ruston to Farmerville; State Route 15 through Farmerville; State Route 11 from Farmerville to Marion; and State Route 156 from Marion to the Arkansas state line.  These highways were joined together under the single designation of LA 33 when the Louisiana Department of Highways renumbered the state highway system in 1955.  LA 15 remained on the Farmerville segment co-signed with the new LA 33 as it was one of the few pre-1955 routes to retain its identity after the 1955 renumbering.

Since the 1955 renumbering, LA 33 has changed very little.  Its only realignment occurred in the early 1960s in connection with the Bayou D'Arbonne crossing.  In November 1963, the bayou and two other small waterways near Farmerville were impounded to create Bayou D'Arbonne Lake, more commonly known as Lake D'Arbonne.  That year, an embankment and bridge were constructed on the concurrent LA 15/LA 33 to cross the new man-made lake.  In May 2013, Louisiana Governor Bobby Jindal signed a bill into law renaming the bridge in honor of James Peyton Smith, the state representative from Union and Morehouse parishes from 1964 to 1972.  Though the old bayou bridge was demolished, much of the original roadway still exists to the north of the current alignment and is now used as a boat launch.  LA 15 was also realigned near its junction with LA 33, which was moved  to the southwest.  The original roadbed of LA 15 here is now partially submerged in the lake waters.

Another improvement affecting LA 33 was the opening of the interchange with I-20 in April 1960.  This portion of I-20, extending  from Ruston to Choudrant, was the first rural segment of interstate highway to be completed in Louisiana.  LA 33 was subsequently widened southward from the interchange to handle the increased traffic, which included the replacement of the original two-lane overpass across I-20 with the current five-lane span in 1991.  The highway was widened northward from I-20 through the remainder of its distance in Ruston more recently, around 2010.

Major intersections

See also

References

External links

Maps / GIS Data Homepage, Louisiana Department of Transportation and Development

0033
Transportation in Lincoln Parish, Louisiana
Transportation in Union Parish, Louisiana